The Young Artist Former Child Star Lifetime Achievement Award is an honorary Young Artist Award bestowed by the Young Artist Association to recognize former child actors and/or child singers for lifetime achievement within the motion picture, television and radio industries. In recent years, the award has also been known as the Mickey Rooney Award, in honor of former child star Mickey Rooney, however, the spirit of the award has remained essentially the same since its inception.

History
First presented in 1979, the "Former Child Star Award" was one of the Young Artist Association's original "Special Awards".  Throughout the past 34 years, the association has conferred its special "Lifetime Achievement Award" upon 29 former child actors and child singers for their work within the entertainment industry.  Recipients of the honor receive the traditional Young Artist Award statuette; a gilded figure of a man displaying a star above its head, reminiscent of a miniature child-sized Oscar.

The first recipient was Jane Withers, who was honored at the 1st Youth in Film Awards ceremony for her work as a child actress on radio and in feature films during the 1930s. The 2013 recipient is Melissa Joan Hart, who will be honored at the 34th Young Artist Awards ceremony for her roles as Clarissa Darling on the 1990s Nickelodeon sitcom Clarissa Explains It All and as Sabrina Spellman on the ABC sitcom Sabrina, the Teenage Witch.  After former child star Mickey Rooney received the accolade at the 12th Youth in Film Awards ceremony, the award has also been known as the "Mickey Rooney Award" in his honor.

Honorees
As one of the Young Artist Association's "Honorary" awards, the traditional age restrictions used for the association's "competitive" categories do not apply.  Candidates eligible for nomination in one of the Young Artist Award's competitive categories must be between the ages of 5 and 21, and winners are selected by secret ballot of the 125 members of the Young Artist Association as well as former Youth in Film Award/Young Artist Award winners. As the title of the award implies, a "former" child star can be presumed to be over the age of 21, however, all honorees are recognized specifically for their achievements within the entertainment industry as juveniles.

See also
Hollywood Walk of Fame
Young Artist Award

References

External links
 
  Young Artist Awards photographs at LIFE.com

Young Artist Awards
Lifetime achievement awards
Awards established in 1979
1979 establishments in the United States